The discography of WANDS, a Japanese rock band, consisting of six studio albums, one VHS, three DVDs, one Blu-Ray Release and Twenty-Two singles to date. All songs during the 1st - 3rd Period were composed by Show Wesugi.

Albums

Studio albums

Compilation albums

Singles

Collaboration singles

VHS, DVD and Blu-Rays

References

Discographies of Japanese artists
Pop music group discographies